Antoni "Toni" Besolí Cervellera (born 19 May 1976 in Andorra la Vella) is an Andorran judoka, who competed in the men's middleweight category.

Besoli qualified as a lone judoka for the Andorran squad in the men's middleweight class (90 kg) at the 2004 Summer Olympics in Athens, by granting a tripartite invitation from the International Judo Federation. He fell in a bodily-crushing ippon defeat to Dominican Republic's two-time Olympian Vicbart Geraldino just forty-seven seconds into their opening match.

References

External links

1976 births
Living people
Andorran male judoka
Olympic judoka of Andorra
Judoka at the 2004 Summer Olympics
People from Andorra la Vella